Survivor Srbija: Philippines is the second season of the Serbian version of the Survivor television series, created by Vision Team production company and broadcast by Fox televizija.

The second season of Survivor Srbija was an international co-production recorded on the Caramoan Peninsula in the Philippines during the summer of 2009, with 17 contestants from Serbia, two contestants from Macedonia, two contestants from Slovenia and one contestant from Bosnia and Herzegovina.

Featuring 22 contestants (11 men and 11 women), broadcast started on October 19, 2009 in Serbia, Macedonia, Bosnia and Herzegovina and Montenegro; and on October 21, 2009 in Slovenia.

The show was hosted by Andrija Milošević, as in the first season.

In addition to Serbia, the show was broadcast in Bosnia and Herzegovina (Alternativna Televizija and NTV Hayat), Macedonia (Sitel televizija), Montenegro (PRO TV) and Slovenia (TV3 Slovenia).

Because of different language Slovenian Broadcaster TV3 localized their broadcast, they were using subtitled Serbian Fox TV shows with addition of their own on-site co-host Ula Furlan stories about Philippines - Ula's Survivor.

Slovenian version also omitted word Srbija from show title - it is titled simply Survivor.

Aleksandar Krajišnik was named the winner in the final episode on February 18, 2010, defeating Teja Lapanja and Vesna Đolović with a vote of 6-3-1. He won a prize of €100.000.

In addition, Aleksandar Bošković was named "Public Favourite", earning the fans' vote over Nikola Kovačević, Srđan Dinčić and Aleksandar Krajišnik and he won a car, a Nissan Navara.

Contestants

Total votes is the number of votes a castaway has received during Tribal Councils where the castaway is eligible to be voted out of the game.  It does not include the votes received during the final Tribal Council.

 Branislava was not chosen to continue, after neither of the swapped tribes had chosen her for a member (the rule was that the last unchosen contestant must be eliminated), and she went to Ghost Island. She wasn't voted out regularly at Tribal Council.

 Predrag said at Tribal Council that he wanted to leave the game, so he quit the game and there wasn't a vote.

 Anita hurt her leg during last immunity challenge and she had to leave the game.

 On day 26 Manobo and Ga 'dang had the opportunity to choose one person from the other tribe; Manobo chose Dina, Ga 'dang chose Srđan. On day 29 Dina and Srđan had the opportunity to return to their last tribe. Srđan returned to Manobo, but Dina objected to return to Ga 'dang, and she stayed on Manobo.

 Three additional votes were cast against Ana S. during a tie-breaker vote.

 Because Nikola is the winner on Ghost Island, he was brought back into the game on day 32, so he is listed as having placed in two different points in the game.

The game
Cycles in this article refer to the three-day periods in the game (unless indicated), composed of at least the Immunity Challenge and the subsequent Tribal Council.

In the case of multiple tribes or castaways who win reward or immunity, they are listed in order of finish, or alphabetically where it was a team effort; where one castaway won and invited others, the invitees are in brackets.

 Through cycle 1 to 10 the challenge was an "Individual Immunity"; through cycle 11 to 16, in even weeks the challenge was a "Double Vote and Little Reward", and in odd weeks the challenge was a "Black Vote and Little Reward". At cycle 17 the challenge was "Place in the Final" where the remaining castaways compete in 3 final challenges for a place in the final.   
 Ghost Island was not yet introduced.   
 Aleksandar K. gave his immunity to Predrag.   
 Ghost Island introduced; Gordana became first inhabitant.   
 Aleksandar K. gave his immunity to Milena.  
 There was no reward challenge because of the first switch. 
 Srđan gave his immunity to Vesna.   
 Luka gave his immunity to Vesna.   
 Dušan gave his immunity to Dina.   
 Dušan gave his immunity to Vesna.   
 There was no reward challenge because of the merge.   
 Aleksandar K. gave his immunity to Teja.   
 Locator of Hidden Immunity Idol is active after merge.   
 Challenges on Ghost Island are over, Nikola is the winner and he is back in the merged tribe. Only the Locator of Hidden Immunity Idol is active on Ghost Island.   
 Srđan gave his immunity to Dina. 
 Aleksandar K. gave his immunity to Njegoš. 
 Njegoš gave his immunity to Aleksandar K. 
 This challenges is not active at cycle 17. 
 Locator of Hidden Immunity Idol on Ghost Island are over.

Voting history
Tribal Council (TC) numbers are almost the same as Cycle numbers as a Tribal Council occurs at the end of each cycle; eliminations that happen outside a Tribal Council do not bear a Tribal Council number, but count towards a cycle. Episode numbers denote the episode(s) when the voting and subsequent revelation of votes and elimination during a Tribal Council took place. They can also denote the episode wherein a contestant officially left the game for any reason.

 This castaway could not vote at Tribal Council, because s/he had the "Black Vote necklace".

 Branislava was eliminated irregularly, outside of Tribal Council. She was not chosen to join any of new swapped tribes, thus she was eliminated.

 Predrag said at Tribal Council that he wanted to leave the game, so he quit the game and there wasn't a vote.

 Anita was evacuated due to medical reasons, therefore no vote occurred for her removal from the game.

 The first Tribal Council Vote resulted in a tie. Per the rules, a second vote was held where the castaways involved in the tie would not vote and the remaining castaways could only vote for the tied contestants.

 Ana S. and Vesna were not eligible to vote in the second Tribal Council vote. Ana S. was voted out after the first Tribal Council; vote resulted in a tie.

 Dušan decided to not vote in the Tribal Council, and as a punishment he received an extra vote.

 Klemen decided to not use double vote in the Tribal Council, and as a punishment he received an extra vote.

 Srđan decided to not vote in the Tribal Council, and as a punishment he received an extra vote.

 The public from Serbia and from region (Macedonia, Montenegro, Slovenia and Bosnia and Herzegovina) was allowed to award a jury vote to one of the finalists. Public gave two votes for Aleksandar K.

References

External links
Survivor Serbia info and Forum discussions - www.survivorsrbija.biz
Fan site and Forum
Fan site
Official site
Official site - Slovenia
Official site - Bosnia and Herzegovina

Serbia
Survivor Srbija
2009 Serbian television seasons
2010 Serbian television seasons
Television shows filmed in the Philippines